Kálmán Hazai (17 July 1913 – 21 December 1996) was a Hungarian water polo player who competed in the 1936 Summer Olympics. He was born in Marosvásárhely.

He was part of the Hungarian team which won the gold medal. He played five matches including the final. He died in Copenhagen, Denmark.

See also
 Hungary men's Olympic water polo team records and statistics
 List of Olympic champions in men's water polo
 List of Olympic medalists in water polo (men)

External links
 

1913 births
1996 deaths
Hungarian male water polo players
Water polo players at the 1936 Summer Olympics
Olympic gold medalists for Hungary in water polo
Medalists at the 1936 Summer Olympics
20th-century Hungarian people